Steve Lund (born January 9, 1989) is a Canadian actor, best known for playing the roles of Jake in Schitt’s Creek and Nick Sorrentino in Bitten.

Before acting, he played in the Quebec Major Junior Hockey League, for the P.E.I. Rockets (now the Charlottetown Islanders) and the Halifax Mooseheads, before being forced to end his hockey career in 2008 after a series of concussions. Within months of ending that career, he began taking acting classes in Vancouver and found his new career.

He has appeared in several Hallmark Channel television films, as well as television shows such as Haven, Reign, and, most recently, a leading role in the reboot of Street Legal.

Filmography

References

External links

 

1989 births
Living people
Canadian male television actors
Male actors from Halifax, Nova Scotia